Champasak (or Champassak, Champasack – Lao: ຈຳປາສັກ ) is a province in southwestern Laos, near the borders with Thailand and Cambodia. It is one of the three principalities that succeeded the Lao kingdom of Lan Xang. As of the 2015 census, it had a population of 694,023. The capital is Pakse, but the province takes its name from Champasak, the former capital of the Kingdom of Champasak.

Champasak is bordered by Salavan province to the north, Sekong province to the northeast, Attapeu province to the east, Cambodia to the south, and Thailand to the west. The Mekong River forms part of the border with neighboring Thailand and contains Si Phan Don ('Four Thousand Islands') in the south of the province, on the border with Cambodia.

Champasak has played a central role in the history of Siam and Laos, with frequent battles taking place in and around Champasak. Its cultural heritage includes ancient temple ruins and French colonial architecture. Champasak has some 20 wats (temples), such as Wat Phou, Wat Luang, and Wat Tham Fai. Freshwater dolphins and the province's many waterfalls are tourist attractions.

History
From the 1st to 9th centuries CE, Champasak province was part of the Funan and then Chenla Kingdoms. Between the 10th and 13th centuries it was part of the Khmer Empire. In 1354, the area came under the control of King Fa Ngum and the Lan Xang Empire. The Angkor empire went into decline between the 15th and 17th centuries when it was annexed by Lan Xang. In 1707, Champasak became one of three kingdoms arising from a dissolved Lan Xang Empire. The kingdom had only three kings, Soi Sisamut (1713–37), nephew of Suriya Vangas, Sainya Kuman (1737–91) and lastly Fai Na (1791–1811). In 1829 Siam annexed Champassak following the Chao Anouvong Rebellion. Pakse, the capital of the province, was established by the French in 1905 as an administrative outpost at the confluence of Xe Don (Don River) and the Mekong.

Geography
The Mekong forms part of the border with neighboring Thailand and, after a sharp bend projecting westward, turns east and flows southeasterly through the province down to Cambodia. Champasak can be reached from Thailand through Sirindhorn District's Chong Mek border crossing, to Vang Tao on the Lao side, from where the highway leads east towards the provincial capital, Pakse. The capital is on Laos' most important highway, Route 13, and the French legacy can be seen in the city's architecture.

Si Phan Don (Four Thousand Islands) is on a stretch of the Mekong north of the border with Cambodia. Of these islands, Don Khong is the largest and has a number of small villages, temples, and caves. A French-built bridge on the abandoned railway line provides the link with two smaller islands, Don Det and Don Khon.

There are many waterfalls in the province such as the Tad Somphamit (or Liphi) Waterfall, at Don Khon to the west of Ban Khon village. Below the falls in the calmer waters of the Mekong the fresh water dolphins can be seen. The Khone Phapheng Falls to the east of Don Khon, also on the Mekong, cascade along a broad mouth of rock slopes in a curvilinear pattern. The  Tad Fane Waterfall (or Dong Hua Sao) in the Bolaven Plateau is the country's highest waterfall. The plateau is east of Pakse.

Protected areas
Xe Pian National Biodiversity Conservation Area (NBCA) lies in the southeastern part of the province, while the Dong Hua Sao National Protected Area is in the eastern area. The Center for Protection and Conservation of freshwater dolphins is on the Cambodian border. These freshwater dolphins are known locally as pakha in Lao, and are found only on this particular stretch of the Mekong River. Hire boats are available to see these endangered dolphins, either from Ban Khon or Ban Veunkham (at the southern end of the islands).

A portion of the IBA (10,000 hectares) overlaps with the  Phou Xieng Thong National Protected Area. The IBA encompasses two provinces, Champasak and Salavan. Its topography consists of earth banks, rocky banks, rocky islands, sandbars, low vegetated islands, rocky islets, and sandy beaches. Notable avifauna include Laos's last known nesting little terns, river lapwings, river terns, small pratincoles and wire-tailed swallows.

The  Phou Xiang Thong IBA is also in the Phou Xiengthong NBCA. This IBA spans two provinces, Champasak and Salavan. The topography consists of low hills, lowlands, rivers, and seasonal streams. Habitat is characterized by dry deciduous tropical forest, moist deciduous tropical forest, semi-evergreen tropical rainforest, mixed deciduous forest, dry dipterocarp forest, and open rocky savanna. Notable avifauna include the grey-faced tit-babbler, green peafowl, red-collared woodpecker, and Siamese fireback.

Administrative divisions
The province is made up of the following districts:

Demographics
The population of the province, from the 2015 census, is 694,023. The ethnic composition consists mainly of Lao, but also Chieng, Inthi, Kaseng, Katang, Kate, Katu, Kien Lavai, Laven, Nge, Nyaheun, Oung, Salao, Suay, Tahang and Tahoy ethnic groups, as well as ethnic Vietnamese.

Economy
The economic output of the province consists primarily of agricultural products—especially production of coffee, tea, and rattan. It is one of the most important coffee producing areas of Laos along with Salavan and Sekong provinces. Pakse is the main trade and travel link with Thailand, Cambodia, and Vietnam. Following the building of the Lao Nippon bridge across the Mekong at Pakse in 2002, trade with Thailand has multiplied several fold. The bridge lies at the junction of roads to the Bolaven Plateau in the east, Thailand in the west, and Si Phan Don to the south. Consequently, the market place at the Talat Sao Heung, near the bridge, has become one of the largest in Laos. Improved infrastructure has also led to an increase in tourism since the 1990s. The Jhai Coffee Farmers Cooperative, headquartered at the provincial capital, operates on the Bolaven Plateau. The Bolaven Plateau is also notable for its rubber, tobacco, peaches, pineapple, and rice production.

Landmarks
Champasak has some 20 wats (temples). The Khmer ruins of Wat Phou are in the capital of the Champasak District. Wat Phou was designated a UNESCO World Heritage Site on 14 December 2001. It is the second such site in Laos. The temple complex, built in the Khmer style, overlooks the Mekong River and was an important Hindu temple in the Khmer Empire. At the same location are the ruins of other pre-Angkor monuments. Wat Phou Asa is an ancient Hindu-Khmer pagoda, built on flat rock on Phou Kao Klat Ngong Mount in Pathoumphone District. It can be reached via Route 13, south of Pakse, and then by foot from Ban Klat Ngong. The pagoda was built by the Khmers and is in a ruined state, but is an important archaeological site. It is now under renovation. Wat Luang and Wat Tham Fai were built in 1935. There is a monastic school and a small Buddha foot imprint shrine in Wat Pha Bhat and Wat Tham Fai; religious festivals are held within a large open area.

The pathway to the building is lined with columns of sandstone. It is in a ruined state. There is a large chamber with doors in the front and rear and windows on two sides. Inscriptions imply the site is closely related to Wat Phou Champasak. An archeological site is at Pu Asa on a mountain top. Kiat Ngong village is noted for its medicinal plants and forest products.

The Champasak Historical Heritage Museum in Pakse provides insight into the history of Laos as well as its cultural and artistic heritage. In Wat Amath, treasures dating back to the Stone Age can be seen. The museum has few artifacts, but many old documents, three old Dong Son bronze drums, 7th century lintels made of sandstone, textile and jewelry collections including items such as iron ankle bracelets, ivory ear plugs, musical instruments, a stele in Thai script (15th to 18th century), a water jar of 11th or 12th century vintage, a small Shiva linga, a model of Wat Phu Champasak, Buddha images, and American weaponry. The province was the site of Laos's first railway, the Don Det – Don Khon narrow gauge railway on Don Det and Don Khon Islands.

The region is also home to the Champasack University.

Culture
During the third lunar month (February), celebrations at Angkor precede Champasack's traditional Wat Phou Festival at the site of ruins. The festival is noted for elephant racing, cockfighting, and cultural performances of traditional Lao music and dance.

References

Bibliography

External links 

 
Provinces of Laos